John 1:12 is the twelfth verse in the first chapter of the Gospel of John in the New Testament of the Christian Bible.

Content
In the original Greek according to Westcott-Hort, this verse is:
Ὅσοι δὲ ἔλαβον αὐτόν, ἔδωκεν αὐτοῖς ἐξουσίαν τέκνα Θεοῦ γενέσθαι, τοῖς πιστεύουσιν εἰς τὸ ὄνομα αὐτοῦ·  

In the King James Version of the Bible the text reads:
But as many as received him, to them gave he power to become the sons of God, even to them that believe on his name:

The New International Version translates the passage as:
Yet to all who received him, to those who believed in his name, he gave the right to become children of God.

Analysis
Lapide comments on the phrase "on Him", as signifying the Person of Christ, and that the full meaning is "as many as have received Christ, that is, to all who believe in His name, He has given power to become sons of God," which has the same sense as (1 John 5:1): "Whosoever believes that Jesus is the Christ, is born of God."

Commentary from the Church Fathers
Augustine: "But if none at all received, none will be saved. For no one will he saved, but he who received Christ at His coming; and therefore he adds, As many as received Him."

Chrysostom: "Whether they be bond or free, Greek or Barbarian, wise or unwise, women or men, the young or the aged, all are made meet for the honour, which the Evangelist now proceeds to mention. To them gave He power to become the sons of God."

Augustine: "O amazing goodness! He was born the Only Son, yet would not remain so; but grudged not to admit joint heirs to His inheritance. Nor was this narrowed by many partaking of it."

Chrysostom: "He saith not that He made them the sons of God, but gave them power to become the sons of God: showing that there is need of much care, to preserve the image, which is formed by our adoption in Baptism, untarnished: and showing at the same time also that no one can take this power from us, except we rob ourselves of it. Now, if the delegates of worldly governments have often nearly as much power as those governments themselves, much more is this the case with us, who derive our dignity from God. But at the same time the Evangelist wishes to show that this grace comes to us of our own will and endeavour: that, in short, the operation of grace being supposed, it is in the power of our free will to make us the sons of God."

Theophylact of Ohrid: "Or the meaning is, that the most perfect sonship will only be attained at the resurrection, as saith the Apostle, Waiting for the adoption, to wit, the redemption of our body. (Rom. 8:23) He therefore gave us the power to become the sons of God, i. e. the power of obtaining this grace at some future time."

Chrysostom: "And because in the matter of these ineffable benefits, the giving of grace belongs to God, but the extending of faith to man, He subjoins, even to those who believe on his name. Why then declarest thou not, John, the punishment of those who received Him not? Is it because there is no greater punishment than that, when the power of becoming the sons of God is offered to men, they should not become such, but voluntarily deprive themselves of the dignity? But besides this, inextinguishable fire awaits all such, as will appear clearly farther on."

References

External links
For a collection of other versions see BibleHub John 1:12.

01:12